The Adventures of Panama Red is the fourth country rock album by the New Riders of the Purple Sage, released in 1973.  It is widely regarded as one of the group's best efforts, and reached number 55 on the Billboard charts.

The album includes two songs written by Peter Rowan — "Panama Red", which became a radio hit, and "Lonesome L.A. Cowboy".  Another song, "Kick in the Head", was written by Robert Hunter.  Donna Jean Godchaux and Buffy Sainte-Marie contribute background vocals on several tracks.

Track listing
"Panama Red" (Peter Rowan)  – 2:47  	   
"It's Alright With Me" (Dave Torbert)  – 2:43 	
"Lonesome L.A. Cowboy" (Rowan)  – 4:05 	
"Important Exportin Man" (Tim Hovey, Torbert)  – 2:26 	
"One Too Many Stories" (John Dawson)  – 2:54 	
"Kick in the Head" (Robert Hunter)  – 2:30 	
"You Should Have Seen Me Runnin" (Dawson)  – 3:01 	
"Teardrops in My Eyes" (Red Allen, Tommy Sutton)  – 2:15 	
"L.A. Lady" (Troy Seals, Don Goodman, Will Jennings) – 2:13 	
"Thank the Day" (Torbert)  – 2:23 	
"Cement, Clay and Glass" (Spencer Dryden, David Nelson)  – 2:34

Personnel

New Riders of the Purple Sage
John Dawson – guitar, vocals, lead vocals on "Lonesome L.A. Cowboy", "One Too Many Stories", "You Should Have Seen Me Runnin", and "Cement, Clay and Glass"
David Nelson – electric guitar, vocals, lead vocals on "Panama Red", and "Teardrops In My Eyes"
Dave Torbert – bass, guitar, vocals, lead vocals on "It's Alright with me", "Important Exportin' Man", "Kick In the Head", "L.A. Lady", and "Thank the Day"
Buddy Cage – pedal steel guitar
Spencer Dryden – drums, percussion

Additional Musicians
Donna Jean Godchaux – vocals on "Important Exportin Man" and "L.A. Lady"
Buffy Sainte-Marie – vocals on "You Should Have Seen Me Runnin'" and "Cement, Clay and Glass"
Norbert Putnam – bass on "Thank the Day"
The Memphis Horns, arranged by Norbert Putnam and the Memphis Horns

Production
Producer: Norbert Putnam
Recording engineer: Tom Flye
Associate engineers: John Stronach, Bobby Hughes
Sound engineers: Tom Anderson, Phil Brown, Bob Edwards
Remix engineer: Norbert Putnam
Cover art: Lore and Chris
Recorded at the Record Plant, Sausalito
Mixed at Quadrafonic Studios, Nashville

References

New Riders of the Purple Sage albums
1973 albums
Albums produced by Norbert Putnam
Columbia Records albums